Rashidi (also Romanized as Rashīdī) is a village in Japelaq-e Sharqi Rural District, Japelaq District, Azna County, Lorestan Province, Iran. At the 2006 census, its population was 126, in 31 families.

References 

Towns and villages in Azna County